is a railway station owned by West Japan Railway Company (JR West) in Tsurumi-ku, Osaka, Japan.

Lines
West Japan Railway Company (JR West)
Katamachi Line (Gakkentoshi Line)
Osaka Higashi Line

Layout
Hanaten Station has two island platforms with four tracks on the ground.

History 
Station numbering was introduced in March 2018 with Hanaten being assigned station number JR-H39.

Stations next to Hanaten

References

External links

Railway stations in Japan opened in 1895
Railway stations in Osaka Prefecture